"Standing Outside the Fire" is a song co-written and recorded by American country music artist Garth Brooks.  It was released in December 1993 as the third single from his album In Pieces.  The song also appears on The Hits, The Limited Series, Double Live, and The Ultimate Hits. It reached number 3 on the Billboard Country Charts in 1994. It was also a success internationally and reached the top 30 of the UK singles chart, a rare feat for a country singer at the time. The song was written by Brooks, along with Jenny Yates.

Content
 Key: A major.
 Length - 3:52
"Standing Outside the Fire" is known by many to be a song of inspiration. One notable line in the chorus reads "Life is not tried, it is merely survived if you're standing outside the fire."

Background and production 
Brooks provided the following background information on the song in the CD booklet liner notes from The Hits:

"I was in Los Angeles in 1992, hanging out with a good friend, Jenny Yates.  In a conversation I was describing something that I thought was really close, but for me it just stood outside the fire.  There was that brilliant moment of silence when we just looked at each other and smiled,  Within an hour and half, this song was written.  This is another song of inspiration, and Jenny is that way when it comes to inspiration.  I don't know if I have ever met a bigger dreamer than Jenny - to the one who saw the vision and made it happen - may hats off to Jenny Yates."

Mark Casstevens played acoustic guitar, Chris Leuzinger played electric guitar, Milton Sledge played drums, Mike Chapman played bass guitar, Rob Hajacos played fiddle, Bobby Wood played piano, Sam Bacco and Ferrell Morris provided percussion, Sam Bush played mandolin, and Trisha Yearwood provided harmony vocals.

Music video
Brooks claims, on his All Access DVD, that most letters he receives regarding "Standing Outside the Fire" are from participants (or relatives of) in Special Olympics. In the emotional and inspirational music video , a high school student with Down syndrome named Brandon decides to not participate in the institution's Special Olympics but signs up for the regular event. There is much strife between Brandon's father and mother concerning whether or not he should be allowed to do this. The father is strongly opposed, claiming that "he will embarrass himself". However, the mother believes the father disapproves because he himself will be embarrassed. Brandon is seen working very hard for the meet. On the day of the State Track and Field Meet, Brandon trips during a race and is injured. The coach tries to help him out, but his father runs on the track and encourages his son to finish the race regardless, rather than quit. The father says to the coach, "Get away from him!  He is not finished!"  After his father's encouragement, Brandon picks himself up and sprints across the finish line, where he is emotionally embraced by both of his parents.

Brooks is not seen until two minutes into the video, where he is playing and singing with his band in front of a set resembling the sign-up board, which is on fire. After that, Brooks is also seen among the crowd of the sports day event. He said at the time that the reason for this is that he wanted the focus of the video to be on the storyline, versus him playing the song. Contrary to popular belief, the drum kit Garth's drummer Mike Palmer was playing was placed directly outside the fire and melted during the shoot. The video was directed by Jon Small, and was filmed over three days in suburbs of Los Angeles, California. The school scenes (including the track meet) were filmed at John Marshall High School, the same school where Van Halen's "Hot For Teacher" video and the final carnival scene from Grease were filmed, while the residential scenes were filmed in nearby Westwood.

Track listing 
UK CD single Capitol CDCL 712 - 1994
 "Standing Outside the Fire"
 "Unanswered Prayers"
 "In Lonesome Dove"
 "Ain't Goin' Down ('Til the Sun Comes Up)"

UK 2 disc CD single Capitol CDCLS 712 - 1994

Disc One
 "Standing Outside the Fire"
 "The Night Will Only Know"
 "Dixie Chicken"
Disc Two
 "Standing Outside the Fire"
 "Unanswered Prayers"
 "In Lonesome Dove"
 "Ain't Going Down ('Til the Sun Comes Up)"

Netherlands CD single Capitol 72438136129 - 1994
 "Standing Outside the Fire"
 "The Night Will Only Know"
 "Dixie Chicken"
 "In Lonesome Dove"

Australian CD single Capitol - 1993
 "Standing Outside the Fire"
 "Friends in Low Places"
 "Every Now and Then"
 "Interview"

UK 7" vinyl single Capitol CL 712 - 1993
 "Standing Outside the Fire"
 "The Night Will Only Know"

Chart positions

Year-end charts

References

External links 
 "Standing Outside the Fire" Lyrics
 "Standing Outside the Fire" Music Video

1993 singles
1993 songs
Garth Brooks songs
Songs written by Garth Brooks
Song recordings produced by Allen Reynolds
Liberty Records singles